The Holding Point is an area in the Town of Horseheads, New York that is the site of the Horseheads Industrial Center.
The name dates back to World War II, when the federal government used eminent domain to obtain  of farmland north of the Village of Horseheads to hold German prisoners of war and to store ammunition, jeeps and other war supplies.  The land reverted to civilian control after the war and since has been converted to an industrial center  and recreational sports complex . Schlumberger Technology Corp owns a significant portion of the Holding Point as they prepare the lot for gas drilling in New York .

External links
 The Center at Horseheads (aka the Holding Point)

Populated places in Chemung County, New York